Colonel Nicolas Jean Robert Conrad Auguste Sandherr (6 June 1846 – 24 May 1897) was a French military officer involved in the Dreyfus Affair.

Early life and career
Sandherr was born in Mulhouse, in Alsace, then a part of France and also the hometown of the Dreyfus family. The son of a notary at the Mulhouse commercial court, Sandherr joined the French infantry via the military academy of Saint-Cyr. He was promoted successively to sub-lieutenant in the light infantry in 1866, lieutenant in 1870, and captain in 1873. In 1876, his high potential gained him admission in the first class of students at the École supérieure de guerre and he left the academy breveted as a major.

Wounded in combat at the start of the Franco-Prussian War of 1870, Sandherr was named a Knight of the Legion of Honor in September of that year. He was charged with classifying Tunisian tribes by their hostility to the French presence.

Head of the Statistical Section
Named major in 1885, he joined the “Statistical Section” of the army general staff, the harmless name used to disguise the French military's counter-espionage service.  In 1887, he took command of the Section. Promoted to lieutenant-colonel in 1891, he was placed under the direct orders of General Gonse, at the start of the Dreyfus Affair.

Dreyfus Affair
Sandherr was assisted by Commandant Henry, an officer who had the total confidence of General Gonse. In September 1894, the Statistical Section intercepted a handwritten note found in the wastepaper basket of the German ambassador in Paris, thanks to a household servant in the embassy.  The document established that French military secrets had been handed over to the Germans, then considered a national enemy. Sandherr gathered a secret commission of inquiry that hastily decided on  Captain Alfred Dreyfus as the perpetrator. Very quickly, Dreyfus was arrested and condemned.

Promoted to colonel on April 14, 1895, Sandherr left his job at the Statistical Section on July 1 of that year to take command of the 20th Infantry Regiment at Montauban. His successor at the Statistical Section was Lieutenant-Colonel Georges Picquart, who would effectively agitate for and support Dreyfus’ rehabilitation. The scandal escalated in 1898 when it became apparent that the prosecution's case had been fabricated and incriminating documents had been forged by Commandant Henry.

Sandherr did not live to see the end of the Dreyfus Affair although he was one of its initiators. Struck by a general paralysis (a neurosyphilis-incited meningitis), he had to leave active service in December 1896 and succumbed to his sickness before the scandal came to light. He was made an officer of the Legion of Honor in 1888.

References

External links 
 Sandherr's file at the Légion d'honneur

1846 births
1897 deaths
Military personnel from Mulhouse
École Spéciale Militaire de Saint-Cyr alumni
French Army officers
People associated with the Dreyfus affair
Officiers of the Légion d'honneur